Slikkendam is a hamlet in the Dutch province of South Holland. It is a part of the municipality of Nieuwkoop, and lies about 8 km north of Woerden.

References

Populated places in South Holland
Geography of Nieuwkoop